KDS may refer to:

 KDS (company) (Klee Data System), a travel & expense management company
 Conservative Democrats of Slovakia
 Christian Democratic Party (Czech Republic), former political party in the Czech Republic
 Christian Democrats (Sweden), a political party in Sweden
 Khalsa Diwan Society Vancouver
 Kinetic data structure, a data structure used to track an attribute of a geometric system that is moving continuously.
 Committee for State Security (Bulgaria); abbreviated КДС or KDS